"Rock and a Hard Place" is a song recorded by American country music singer Bailey Zimmerman. The song charted in June 2022, reaching number two on Billboard Hot Country Songs. It was released on country radio on December 12, 2022 as the second single from his debut EP Leave the Light On and his upcoming debut studio album Religiously. The Album.

Content
The song is about a male who is facing a relationship about to break up, describing the scenario as "between a rock and a hard place". Taste of Country writer Carmen Liptak wrote that Zimmerman has "gravelly, rock-informed vocal delivery and strong storytelling skills", and compared his style to Parker McCollum and Tucker Beathard.

Commercial performance
"Rock and a Hard Place" debuted at number two on the Billboard Hot Country Songs chart dated June 20, 2022. This peak was achieved mostly through streaming of the song, as it was not yet a radio single. It was the second highest debuting song on that chart for the entire year.

Charts

Weekly charts

Year-end charts

Certifications

Release history

References

2022 singles
2022 songs
Bailey Zimmerman songs
Warner Records Nashville singles
Country ballads